Joey Boland (born 15 December 1987) is an Irish hurler for Dublin and Na Fianna.

Career
He made his debut on the senior hurling team in the league for Dublin in 2007 during the opening game against Wexford.  Previously, Joey played for the U21 team. In 2010, Joey Boland was named as the Friends of Dublin Hurling senior hurler of the year.

References

1987 births
Living people
Na Fianna hurlers
Dublin inter-county hurlers